Jeffrey John Krosnoff (September 24, 1964 – July 14, 1996) was an American race car driver.  A competitor in the CART PPG Indy Car World Series, he was killed in a racing accident during the 1996 Molson Indy Toronto.

Early life and career 
Krosnoff was born in Tulsa, Oklahoma, but grew up in La Cañada, California, where he attended Flintridge Preparatory School, a private high school. He then attended the University of California, San Diego for one year beginning in September 1982. Afterward, he transferred to UCLA, where he majored in Business. Throughout his college career, Krosnoff was focused on pursuing his dream of professional racecar driving.

Krosnoff competed in Japan in Formula 3000, where he was active from 1989 to 1995.  Krosnoff also competed in the 24 Hours of Le Mans several times, scoring 2nd in 1994.  In the 1996 season, he made 11 starts in the CART Champ Car Series, driving a Reynard-Toyota for Arciero-Wells Racing.

Death 

On July 14, 1996, with four laps to go in the Molson Indy Toronto at Exhibition Place, Krosnoff's car made wheel-to-wheel contact with the car of Stefan Johansson, sending it into the air, over a concrete barrier, and into the catch fencing lining the street course.  The fence did not stop the car enough to keep it from hitting a tree which was outside the fence, which turned the car into a light post which was located inside the fence.

The violence of the accident left the car broken in half and sent the cockpit section back across the track. Even though the paramedics were there almost immediately, Krosnoff was already dead after striking the tree and light post. A track official, Gary Avrin, was also killed in the accident when he was struck by the right front wheel of Krosnoff's then-airborne car.

Career results

Complete 24 Hours of Le Mans results

Japanese Top Formula Championship results
(key) (Races in bold indicate pole position) (Races in italics indicate fastest lap)

Complete JGTC results
(key) (Races in bold indicate pole position) (Races in italics indicate fastest lap)

American Open-Wheel racing results
(key)

CART

References

External links
 Jeff Krosnoff Scholarship Fund
 

1964 births
1996 deaths
Sportspeople from Tulsa, Oklahoma
Racing drivers from Oklahoma
24 Hours of Le Mans drivers
Champ Car drivers
Atlantic Championship drivers
Japanese Formula 3000 Championship drivers
Racing drivers who died while racing
Sport deaths in Canada
Accidental deaths in Ontario
Filmed deaths in motorsport
World Sportscar Championship drivers
People from La Cañada Flintridge, California
Nismo drivers
Japanese Sportscar Championship drivers
Jaguar Racing drivers